Acrobyla is a genus of bird dropping moths of the family Noctuidae.

Species
Acrobyla draudti (Brandt, 1939)
Acrobyla eylandti (Christoph, 1884)
Acrobyla kneuckeri Rebel, 1903

References
Natural History Museum Lepidoptera genus database

Cuculliinae
Noctuoidea genera